is a Japanese anime television series created by director Shinji Higuchi, screenwriter Mari Okada, and animation studio Bones. Toshinao Aoki is responsible for the original character designs, Yoshiyuki Itō is serving as the animation character designer and Taisei Iwasaki is composing the music. The anime project was revealed by the staff at the 2017 Tokyo Comic Con in December 2017. It began airing on April 13, 2018. It was licensed by Netflix for domestic and international streaming, and released internationally on September 21, 2018.

Plot
Hisone Amakasu is a rookie in the Japan Air Self-Defense Force, where she is situated at the Gifu air base. She decided to join the force to distance herself from people as, her whole life, she had found it difficult to interact with others due to her candid style of speaking and oftentimes hurtful words, despite that not being her intention. Hisone's decision leads to her life being changed when the concealed "OTF" – Organic Transformed Flyer, or dragon – inside the base chooses her to be his pilot, leading her to discover her destined role as a dragon pilot during their ascension in the skies together. According to legend, dragons are thought to possess a key to unlocking the future of the world.

Characters

Pilots

 (Japanese); Christine Marie Cabanos (English)
JASDF Airman Third Class (later Technical Sergeant). A rookie at the JASDF Gifu Air Base who is chosen by Masotan to be his Dragon Pilot (D-Pilot). She has a habit of constantly speaking her mind without restriction, which makes her seem rude at times, even when she means well. She has a habit of belittling herself in front of others, since she was never close to anyone before and tries to accept things, rather than fight to change them. Her TAC name is "Hisone." 

 (Japanese); Sarah Anne Williams (English)
JASDF Airman Third Class. A cadet at the Gifu Air Base who was initially the only person in line to become a D-Pilot; however, Masotan refused to eat her or any other potential pilot for years. She has a strong fighting instinct and often tries provoke fights with those around. In the beginning, she greatly resents Hisone and tries to bully her, but gradually warms up to her. Her mother was a D-Pilot. She later becomes a spare D-Pilot, after a specific suit is developed that entices the dragon into eating the wearer, but the effects are limited. Her TAC name is "Sexy Jaguar"

 (Japanese); Katelyn Gault (English)
JASDF Senior Master Sergeant. A D-Pilot from Tsuiki Air Base in Fukuoka. Ever since she was young, she had wanted to be the first female fighter pilot; however, a dragon chose her as a D-Pilot, preventing her from becoming an "actual pilot," causing her much anger and self-hatred. Initially, she refuses to see her dragon as anything but a tool and object, to the point where she forces it to remain in its fighter plane form at all times. She is cool and dignified, and is very good at both academics and sports. Her TAC name is "Penguin."

 (Japanese); Erika Harlacher (English)
JASDF Technical Sergeant. A soft and subdued D-Pilot from Misawa Air Base in Aomori with severe shut-in tendencies. While she tends to always imagine the worst-case scenario for all situations and has many negative thoughts, she is also very competent and clever. Her TAC name is "Jimmy."

 (Japanese); Xanthe Huynh (English)
JASDF Technical Sergeant. A big, mother-like D-Pilot from Iruma Air Base in Saitama Prefecture. She understands and cares deeply about the feelings of dragons. Her TAC name is "Morris."

Other characters

 (Japanese); Cindy Robinson (English)
An elderly woman who frequently sells yogurt around the base. She is the last living D-Pilot from the previous Ritual and flew Masotan under the name of "Montparnasse", but quit the OTF squad after her beloved childhood friend and girlfriend Yae, the leading miko of the last Ritual, became Mitatsu's appeasement sacrifice.

 (Japanese); Bryce Papenbrook (English)
JASDF Airman First Class. A young member of Masotan's maintenance team, and Hisone's love interest. He is actually part of the Okonogi family, which is partially responsible for carrying out the Ritual every 74 years. 

 (Japanese); Ben Pronsky (English)
JASDF Captain. A somewhat perverted fighter pilot who has his sights set on Elle. However, underneath his exterior, he is competitive and good-natured.

 (Japanese); Carrie Keranen (English)
JASDF Lieutenant Colonel. Hisone's superior officer. She was once a D-Pilot candidate but was not accepted by Masotan, who instead chose her friend and colleague Moriyama, otherwise known as "Forest." In addition, the man she loved also fell for Moriyama and they got married. Since then, she has remained in the JASDF to train future D-Pilots.

 (Japanese)
The government supervisor of the OTF squad. A slick, callous individual who is only interested in results and gives no consideration to the human factors within the project. His only weakness is his passion for sweets.

 (Japanese)
A strange man, suave man in charge of designing the D-Pilot suits. Nao has a crush on him, although it appears he does not have an interest in anything apart from designing suits.

 (Japanese); Doug Stone (English)
JASDF Major General. The commander of Gifu base's Air Development and Test Wing and Major General. In spite of his tough-looking appearance, he is quite easy going and loves animals, including dragons.

 (Japanese); Erica Mendez (English)
 The leading miko for the series' Ritual, she is an old childhood friend of Haruto. She is romantically interested in him and therefore quite resentful toward Hisone.

Organic Transformed Flyers
The dragons used as OTFs by the JASDF are habitually dressed in transforming armor shaped like military planes to avoid drawing public attention. In order to be flown, the dragons swallow their pilots, who then steer them from within their stomachs via a naturally activated holographic display control system. To protect themselves from the dragons' digestive juices, each pilot is required to wear a special acid-resistant suit. In addition, a D-Pilot must reserve her feelings exclusively for her personal OTF; if she establishes a love relationship with someone else, the bond between them is broken (this event is commonly referred to as "anastomosis").
 / F-15J
 (Japanese)
The dragon that lives in the JASDF Gifu Base and who accepts Hisone as his pilot. Hisone initially calls him "Otofu," a play on the pronunciation of "OTF," until she discovers a plaque inside him with the characters for "Masotan" written on it. His previous pilot called him "Oscar." He has huge wings and a long tail, and is both honest and serious, but has a fear of strangers. He loves to eat minor metals, commonly used in flip phones, a favorite food of his. 
 / F-2A
Elle's dragon. Initially, she refuses to give it a name beyond the technical description of its aircraft appearance. Later, she decides to name it "Norma," derived from the Japanese pronunciation of "F-2" 普通 fuutsuu which means "normal" in English. It has a sharp body and long tail, and appears frighteningly vicious at times.
 / C-1
Mayumi's dragon and the largest of the four, he takes on the form of a large cargo transportation aircraft. He is easygoing and loves to eat. His name means "thighs" in Japanese.
 / E-2C
Lilico's dragon, which takes the form of a large propeller plane. It has a fear of others' eyes and thus always hides one eye with its disk-shaped head.

A gigantic, flying fish-like monster – classified as a "Giant Organic Transformed Flyer" – large enough to be mistaken for a small island or mountain when at rest. Mitatsu awakens once every 74 years to change its resting place, and the group of OTFs perform their duty to guide him to his next destination without leaving calamity in his wake. Additionally, a ritual performed by a group of miko is needed to safely put him to sleep.

Media

Anime
The opening theme song titled  is composed by Taisei Iwasaki and performed by Riko Fukumoto, featuring lyrics written by Mari Okada. The ending theme song titled  is a cover of France Gall's "Le temps de la rentrée," arranged by Iwasaki and performed by D-Pai (D-Pilots, short for "dragon pilots"), a vocal unit comprising voice actresses Misaki Kuno, Tomoyo Kurosawa, Maki Kawase, Satomi Arai and Kaori Nazuka.

Manga
A manga adaptation by original character designer Toshinao Aoki began serialization on March 9, 2018 in the April 2018 issue of the Monthly Dragon Age magazine published by Fujimi Shobo and ran for five chapters.

Reception
Dragon Pilot: Hisone and Masotan received the Excellence Award in the animation category at the 22nd Japan Media Arts Festival.

JASDF Gifu AFB 'Masotan' F-15J's 
Thanks to the series popularity, the Air Development and Test Wing of the JASDF, based at Gifu AFB has painted two of their F-15J's (#999, Serial 12-8928 ; #078, Serial not known) noses with open 'eye-doors', and a representation of Masotan's eyes looking out when the dragon is in Fighter Mode. This is seen on Gifu's website main page.

Notes

References

External links
 

Anime with original screenplays
Bones (studio)
Fujimi Shobo manga
Japan Self-Defense Forces in fiction
Netflix original anime
Shōnen manga
Supernatural anime and manga
Television shows written by Mari Okada
Tokyo MX original programming
Works about air forces